Federal elections were held in West Germany on 15 September 1957 to elect the members of the third Bundestag. The Christian Democratic Union and its longtime ally, the Christian Social Union in Bavaria, won a sweeping victory, taking 270 seats in the Bundestag to win the first – and to date, only – absolute majority for a single German parliamentary group in a free election.

This was the first West German federal election to take place in the Saarland, which – as Saar protectorate – had been a separate entity under French control between 1946 and 1956.

Campaign

Economy
Federal Chancellor Konrad Adenauer had some solid advantages over his Social Democratic Party (SPD) opponent, Erich Ollenhauer; West Germany had become fully sovereign in 1955 and The Law on Pension Reform (backdated to 1 January 1957) was enormously popular when passed in the spring of 1957, while the economy had been growing on average 7% per year since 1953 in part due to young, skilled and highly educated workers immigrating from East Germany keeping productivity high and earnings growth low. West Germany had joined the European Economic Community in March 1957. Its economy was growing steadily with very low unemployment, and most West Germans felt more prosperous and more secure than in 1949 or 1953. Although the West German economic growth was more directly enhanced by the social market economy policies of Economics Minister Ludwig Erhard, many West German voters gave Adenauer the credit for it.

Defence
Although Adenauer had said that he would confine the Bundeswehr to conventional weapons, on 5 April he said "Tactical atomic weapons are nothing but the further development of artillery... it goes without saying that... we cannot dispense with having them for our troops... we must follow suit and have these new types – they are, after all, practically normal weapons." On 12 April eighteen physicists from the Max Planck Institute released the Göttingen Manifesto calling on West Germany to not produce, test or use nuclear weapons. Adenauer at first tried to brush the matter aside, but under heavy criticism from the press decided instead to meet with five of the physicists in Bonn. After a seven-hour meeting a joint communique was issued saying "The Federal Republic will not produce its own nuclear weapons, and consequently the Federal Government has no reason to approach German nuclear scientists about their participation in the development of nuclear weapons." The row continued, having been fuelled by an aggressive note from the Soviet Union in April and ended at the NATO Spring conference in May. Ultimately the row was too far away from the election itself to damage a surprisingly healthy looking Adenauer's prospects.

Results
The All-German Bloc lost all of their seats, but the ideologically similar German Party maintained theirs. The 1957 election was the last time that a right-wing populist party would return members to the Bundestag until Alternative for Germany's entrance in 2017. The election also marked the last time until 1990 that any party other than CDU/CSU or SPD won any constituency seats.

Results by state

Constituency seats

List seats

Aftermath 
Konrad Adenauer led the CDU-CSU coalition to a landslide victory.  The CDU-CSU won an outright majority—to date, the only time a German party has been elected to a majority government in a free election (the CDU and CSU sit as a single bloc in the Bundestag).

Notes

References

Federal elections in Germany
1957 elections in Germany
Konrad Adenauer
1957 in West Germany
September 1957 events in Europe